A Buena Hora (At Good Time) is the 14th studio album from the Spanish singer Sergio Dalma, released by Universal Music Spain in 2008.

Track list

Personnel 
Niall Acott – recording
Jacobo Calderón – synthesizer, piano, arranger, programming, producer
Chris Cameron – piano, organ
Sergio Dalma – vocals
David Daniels – cello
Javier Garza – mixing
Felipe Guevara – recording, Mixing
Juan Guevara – electric guitar
Sebastián Krys – arranger, programming, producer, recording
Lee Levin – Bateria, recording
Perry Mason – violin
Jeremy Murphy – assistant engineer
José Luis Pagán – arranger, programming
Carmen Paris – vocals
John Parsons – guitar
José Carlos Rico – saw
Rafa Sañudo – graphic design
Emlyn Singleton – violin
Oscar Vinader – recording, Mixing
Bruce White – viola

Charts

External links
Sergio Dalma Homepage

2008 albums
Sergio Dalma albums
Universal Music Spain albums